Aurélien Kahn (born 30 December 1968) is a French equestrian. At the 2012 Summer Olympics he competed in the individual and team eventing.

References

External links 
 
 

1968 births
Living people
People from Saint-Maurice, Val-de-Marne
French male equestrians
Olympic equestrians of France
Equestrians at the 2012 Summer Olympics
Sportspeople from Val-de-Marne